Harold Obunga (21 November 1959 – 16 September 1995) was a Kenyan boxer. He competed in the men's heavyweight event at the 1988 Summer Olympics. He lost in quarterfinal to Andrew Golota.

References

External links
 

1959 births
1995 deaths
Heavyweight boxers
Kenyan male boxers
Olympic boxers of Kenya
Boxers at the 1988 Summer Olympics
Place of birth missing